The Artist is Britain’s longest-established practical art magazine, first published in 1931. It is published monthly by The Artists’ Publishing Company from their offices in Tenterden, Kent, and costs £3.30 per issue. It is available to buy from newsagents. Sally Bulgin has been editor of the magazine since 1986.

References

Visual arts magazines published in the United Kingdom
Magazines established in 1931
Monthly magazines published in the United Kingdom
Mass media in Kent